Since 1983, the American funk rock band Red Hot Chili Peppers has released 13 studio albums, two live albums, 12 compilation albums, 11 video albums (including promotional releases), five extended plays, 66 singles (including promotional releases), and 53 music videos. To date, the band has sold over 120 million records worldwide. According to the RIAA the Chili Peppers have 6x Multi-Platinum, 2x Platinum and 3x Gold albums in the US, totalling 27.5m.  They also have 9x Multi-Platinum, 3x Platinum and 4x Gold singles too, totalling 40m. They have been nominated for 19 Grammy Awards, of which they have won 6. They have the most no.1 singles (15), the most cumulative weeks at no.1 (91) and most top-10 songs (28) on the Billboard Alternative Songs chart.  

The Red Hot Chili Peppers released their first three studio albums—1984's The Red Hot Chili Peppers, 1985's Freaky Styley, and 1987's The Uplift Mofo Party Plan—to virtually no commercial success during the mid to late 1980s.  However, after future success with fans visiting their early work, The Uplift Mofo Party Plan would eventually become their earliest album to be certified by the RIAA by going Gold.  It was the only album to feature all 4 founding members and featured the single 'Fight Like A Brave'.  Hillel Slovak sadly passed away and Jack Irons departed.  They were eventually replaced by John Frusciante and Chad Smith. 

It was not until their fourth studio album, 1989's Mother's Milk, that the band received critical attention when the album peaked at no.52 on the Billboard 200.  It became their first album to go Gold and would eventually go onto reach Platinum status.  'Knock Me Down' would be the first single and it became their first ever entry on the Alternative Rock Songs chart reaching no.6.  The follow up single was a cover of Stevie Wonder's 'Higher Ground' it only managed to peak at no.11 on the Alternative Rock Songs chart but was the song that started to get Chili Peppers more attention.  'Taste the Pain' was also released as a single.  Although not on Mother's Milk but recorded around the same time and featured on the 'Pretty Women' soundtrack,  the Chili Peppers released the single 'Show Me Your Soul' which reached no.10.

 After releasing their fifth studio album Blood Sugar Sex Magik in September 1991, the Red Hot Chili Peppers broke into the mainstream. They had switched their record label from EMI to Warner Brothers and now had producer Rick Rubin on board.  The first single 'Give It Away' became a big success and gave them their first no.1 on the Alternative Rock Charts and went Platinum.   But it was the second single "Under the Bridge" which made them household names.  Although it only reached no.6 on the Alternative Rock Charts it peaked at no.2 on the US Billboard Hot 100 and has gone 6xPlatinum.  Other singles released were 'Suck  My Kiss'  reaching no.15 and going Gold and 'Breaking the Girl' reaching no.19 and also going Gold.  The album went on to reach 7xPlatinum in the United States reaching no.3 on the Billboard 200 album chart and gave them a no.1 album in Canada, Australia and New Zealand.  BSSM became a foundation for alternative rock in the 1990s. Guitarist John Frusciante quit the band shortly thereafter in 1992 and was replaced by Arik Marshall who was fired in 1993 being briefly replaced by Jesse Tobias before he too departed.  Recorded in the Blood Sugar Sex  Magik sessions but didnt appear on the album, the Chili Peppers released 'Soul To Squeeze' from the 'Coneheads' soundtrack.  The single reached no.1 on the Alternative Rock Charts.

In 1994 former record label EMI released 'What Hit's?' a compilation of songs from the Chili Peppers first 4 albums.  They promoted it with the single 'Behind The Sun' a track from 1987s Uplift Mofo Party Plan album.  It reached no.7 on the Alternative Rock Charts.  The album reached no.22 on the Billboard 200 and went Platinum.

The Chili Peppers search for a new guitarist ended when they recruited Dave Navarro from fellow L.A. Alternative band Jane's Addiction.   The Chili Peppers would release their sixth studio album, One Hot Minute, in September 1995.  The album was a sizable hit, peaking at no.4 on the US Billboard 200 and going 2xPlatinum.  It reached no.1 in Australia, New Zealand, Sweden and Finland whilst landing in the top 3 in numerous other countries.  The first single 'Warped' reached no.7 on the Alternative Rock Charts and was followed by 'My Friends' no.1 and 'Aeroplane' no.8.  Although it was popular it failed to match the success of its predecessor Blood Sugar Sex Magik.  In 1997 the Chili Peppers released the single 'Love Rollercoaster' from the Beavis and Butthead Do America' soundtrack, reaching no.14.  Navarro was fired in 1998 as the band was starting to work on their follow-up to One Hot Minute.  

After a 6 year absence John Frusciante rejoined the Chili Peppers in 1998 and they released their seventh studio album, Californication, in June 1999. It was a commercial success, peaking at no.3 on the Billboard 200 and being certified 7xPlatinum by the Recording Industry Association of America (RIAA). It reached no.1 in Australia, New Zealand, Italy, Sweden, Finland and Norway whilst landing in the top 3 in numerous other countries.  The album spawned six singles with the first being "Scar Tissue", it reached no.9 on the Billboard 100 and hitting no.1 on the Alternative Rock Charts where it stayed for 16 weeks and was certified 4xPlatinum.  'Around The World' reached no.8 and went Gold.  'Otherside' also reached no.1 and stayed at the top spot for 13 weeks and was certified 3xPlatinum.  The 4th single was 'Californication' and it too reached no.1 going 5xPlatinum.  Other singles released were 'Parallel Universe' no.37 and 'Road Trippin'. 

The success of Californication was followed by By the Way in July 2002. By the Way peaked at no.2 on the Billboard 200 and was certified  2xPlatinum.  It reached the no.1 position in 18 countries around the world including UK, Germany, Australia, New Zealand, Canada, Italy, Switzerland and Holland.  Globally the Chili Peppers were now an established dominant force.  They spawned commercially successful singles, the first being the title track "By the Way", it reached no.1 on the Alternative Rock Charts and remained at the top spot for 14 weeks and was certified 2xPlatinum.  'The Zephyr Song' reached no.6 going Gold and "Can't Stop" reached the no.1 position going 4xPlatinum.  Other singles released were 'Dosed' no.13 and 'Universally Speaking'. 

In late 2003, Warner Brothers released 'The Greatest Hits' a compilation from their Warner years.  Tracks from BSSM, One Hot Minute, Californication and By The Way were included along with 'Higher Ground' plus a couple of new tracks with one of them being 'Fortune Faded' which reached no.8 on the Alternative Rock Charts.  The album reached no.18 on the Billboard 200 and was certified 2xPlatinum.

In August 2004 the Chili Peppers released Live At Hyde Park, which was a double album consisting of songs they performed over their 3 record breaking shows at the famous venue. The album was only released in Europe, Australia and New Zealand.  It reached the no.1 position in UK, Belgium, Austria and Switzerland.

Stadium Arcadium, the band's ninth studio album, was released in May 2006. It became the band's first album to reach no.1 on the Billboard 200 and reached the top spot in other countries including UK, Germany, Australia, New Zealand, Canada, France, Italy,  Switzerland and Holland.  It was a double album featuring 28 tracks, one disc was named 'Mars' and the other 'Jupiter'.  It went onto be certified 4xPlatinum.   Stadium Arcadium spawned three straight no.1 hits on the Billboard Alternative Songs chart; "Dani California" spent 14 consecutive weeks at the top of the chart and also peaked at no.6 on the Billboard Hot 100, it was certified 5xPlatinum.   'Tell Me Baby' went Platinum and 'Snow' achieved 4xPlatinum status.  Other singles released were 'Hump de Bump' reaching no.8 and 'Desecration Smile'.

The Chili Peppers entered the studio in September 2010 to record their 10th studio album, and their first with guitarist Josh Klinghoffer after John Frusciante departed the year before.  The album I'm with You was released in August 2011. It peaked at no.2 on the Billboard 200 and went Gold.  It was a no.1 hit in 19 different countries including UK, Germany, Italy, New Zealand, Holland, Sweden and Switzerland.  "The Adventures of Rain Dance Maggie" the album's lead single, reached no.1 on the Alternative Rock chart and went Platinum.   Other singles that were released included 'The Monarchy Of Rose's' at no.4, 'Look Around' at no.8 and 'Brendan's Death Song'.

For the Chili Peppers next album they decided to try a fresh approach and went with producer Danger Mouse, who replaced Rick Rubin after 25 years and the previous 6 albums.  The new release was titled The Getaway and came out in June 2016. "Dark Necessities", the first single from the album, hit the no.1 spot on the Alternative Rock chart and was certified Platinum. The song was also the band's 25th top ten single on the Alternative Songs chart. It also became only the fourth song ever to top the Mainstream Rock, Alternative Songs and Adult Alternative charts at the same time. The single also became the Chili Peppers 30th to chart inside the chart's top 20. The Getaway made its debut at no.2 on the Billboard 200 chart and was certified Gold.  It reached the top 3 in most countries, hitting the top spot including Australia, Holland, Italy, New Zealand and Switzerland.  Other singles which were released included 'Go Robot' at no.12, 'Sick Love' and 'Goodbye Angels' at no.25. 

In December 2019, the Chili Peppers announced in a released statement that they were parting ways with Klinghoffer and that John Frusciante was again returning to the band.  The Chili Peppers 12th studio album, Unlimited Love, their first album to be released with Frusciante in 16 years, was released on April 1, 2022 with Rick Rubin returning as producer.Unlimited Love made its debut at no.1 on the Billboard 200 charts.  Successful the world over, also reaching no.1 in countries such as UK, Germany, Australia, France, Italy, Switzerland, New Zealand and Holland.  The album was preceded by the first single, "Black Summer", which became the band's highest debuting single at no.3 and eventually reaching no.1 on the Alternative Rock Charts. It also gave the band a no.1 single in 4 different decades, tying them with Green Day.  The song 'Poster Child' was used as a promotional single and they also released the single 'These Are The Ways' which reached no.28. The Chili Peppers announced on the World Tour in support of Unlimited Love that a follow up album was to be expected soon.

Return of the Dream Canteen was released on October 14, 2022 and reached no.3 on the Billboard 200 chart, making it the Chili Peppers 9th consecutive studio album to reached the top 4 in that chart.  It reached no.1 in Germany, France, Holland, New  Zealand and Switzerland.  The album was preceded by the first single, "Tippa My Tongue", The single reached no.1 on the Alternative Rock chart and became the band's 15th No.1, it also meant that the Chili Peppers claimed a no.1 single on 9 consecutive albums.  "Eddie" came out as a promotional single then "The Drummer" was the next single released and it reached no.10.  It became their 28th top ten single on that chart which is a current joint record also held by the Foo Fighters.

Albums

Studio albums

Live albums

Compilation albums

Extended plays

Singles

1980s and 1990s

2000s

2010s

2020s

Promotional singles

Other singles

Other charted songs

Other appearances

Album appearances

Movie appearances

Videos

Video albums

Other video releases

Music videos

See also
 List of songs recorded by Red Hot Chili Peppers
 Red Hot Chili Peppers Official Bootlegs

Notes

References

External links
 Official website
 
 
 

Discography
Alternative rock discographies
Discographies of American artists
Funk music discographies
Rock music group discographies